Aleksei Valentinovich Ilatovskiy (born 21 February 1975) is a former Russian football player.

References

1975 births
Living people
Russian footballers
FC KAMAZ Naberezhnye Chelny players
Russian Premier League players
Association football midfielders